Nottingham Crown Court, or more formally the High Court of Justice and Crown Court, Nottingham is a Crown Court and meeting place of the High Court of Justice on Canal Street in Nottingham, England. The building also accommodates the County Court and the Family Court.

History
Until the early 1980s, the Crown Court sat in the Shire Hall on High Pavement. However, as the number of court cases in Nottingham grew, it became necessary to commission a more substantial courthouse for criminal matters. The site selected by the Lord Chancellor's Department on Canal Street was occupied by a row of shops (including a baker's shop owned by the amateur astronomer, Thomas Bush) and an old canal-side factory.

The new building was designed by architects, P. Harvard, K. Bates and J. Mansell, on behalf of the Property Services Agency and faced with buff stone. The building was opened in two phases: the first phase, which cost £2.2 million, opened in 1980 and the second phase, which cost £6.2 million, opened in 1988. The design involved a glass atrium which projected forward, connecting two wings which were faced with extensive expanses of stone. Internally, the building was equipped with nine courtrooms.

High-profile cases
February 1984 – Conviction of Norman Smith for the murder of Susan Renhard
May 1993 – Conviction of nurse Beverley Allitt for the murder and attempted murder of 13 children at Grantham and Kesteven Hospital
July 2004 – Conviction of Alan Pennell, 16, for the murder of Luke Walmsley, 14
May 2005 – Conviction of Peter Williams for the murder of jeweller Marian Bates
October 2005 – Conviction of Mark Kelly and Junior Andrews for the murder of schoolgirl Danielle Beccan
December 2009 – Conviction of Susan Bacon, Michael Bacon and Peter Jacques for the murder of gamekeeper Nigel Bacon
January 2010 – Conviction of Stewart Hutchinson, jailed for life for the murder of Colette Aram
January 2011 – Collapse of the trial of climate protestors charged with conspiring to shut down Ratcliffe-on-Soar Power Station
April 2013 – Conviction of Mick Philpott and others for the manslaughter of six of his children in a house fire in Derby 
June 2014 – Conviction of Susan Edwards and husband Christopher Edwards for the murders of her parents in 1998, both sentenced to 25 years 
July 2012 and July 2015 - Conviction of Charlotte Collinge in 2012 for the murder of husband Clifford Collinge, sentenced to 23 years with two accomplices both sentenced to 18 years. Following a 2015 re-trial, Charlotte Collinge was cleared and accomplices found guilty with sentences re-imposed

See also
Nottingham Magistrates' Court
National Justice Museum

References

External links
Court details from HM Courts & Tribunals Service
See Nottingham Crown Court on Google Street View

Court buildings in England
Crown Court buildings
Buildings and structures in Nottingham
Government buildings completed in 1981